"Lonely Boy" is a song written and recorded by Paul Anka.  Recorded in August 1958 with Don Costa's orchestra in New York, "Lonely Boy" was not released until May 11, 1959. Anka sang this song in the film Girls Town. When released as a single, it topped the Billboard Hot 100 for four weeks, becoming Anka's first song to do so, although he had earlier topped Billboard's Best Sellers in Stores chart with "Diana". Billboard ranked it as No. 5 for 1959. The song reached No. 2 in the Canadian CHUM Charts.

In 2007, "Lonely Boy" appeared on the Classic Songs (greatest hits) disc of Anka's album Classic Songs, My Way.

Charts

All-time charts

Cover versions
In 1971, by Billy "Crash" Craddock, released on the album Knock Three Times. 
Donny Osmond had a 1972 single revival of the song, charting as the B-side to his hit single, "Why".

See also
Lonely Boy (film)
List of Hot 100 number-one singles of 1959 (U.S.)

References

1959 songs
1959 singles
Paul Anka songs
Donny Osmond songs
Billboard Hot 100 number-one singles
Cashbox number-one singles
Songs written by Paul Anka
ABC Records singles